Proarticulata is a proposed phylum of extinct, bilaterally symmetrical animals known from fossils found in the Ediacaran (Vendian) marine deposits, and dates to approximately . The name comes from the Greek  = "before" and Articulata, i.e. prior to animals with true segmentation such as annelids and arthropods. This phylum was established by Mikhail A. Fedonkin in 1985 for such animals as Dickinsonia, Vendia, Cephalonega, Praecambridium and currently many other Proarticulata are described (see list).

Due to their simplistic morphology, their affinities and mode of life are subject to debate. They are almost universally considered to be metazoans, and due to possessing a clear central axis have been suggested to be stem-bilaterians. In the traditional interpretation, the Proarticulatan body is divided into transverse articulation (division) into isomers as distinct from the transverse articulation segments in annelids and arthropods, as their individual isomers occupy only half the width of their bodies, and are organized in an alternating pattern along the longitudinal axis of their bodies. In other words, one side is not the direct mirror image of its opposite (chirality). Opposite isomers of left and right side are located with displacement of half of their width. This phenomenon is described as the symmetry of gliding reflection.  Some recent research suggests that some proarticulatans like Dickinsonia have genuine segments, and the isomerism is superficial and due to taphonomic distortion. However, other researchers dispute this. Displacement of left-right axis is known in bilaterians, notably lancelets.

Morphology

Vendiamorpha

The body is completely segmented, with all isomers curved towards the posterior, and the first isomer is normally much larger than the rest. The first two isomers at the anterior dorsal end are partly fused. (e.g., Vendia, Paravendia and Karakhtia).

Cephalozoa

These proarticulatans are incompletely segmented, as the anterior zone is free of isomers, often making a "hairband" like appearance  (example cephalozoans include Yorgia, Praecambridium, Andiva, Archaeaspinus, Ivovicia, Podolimirus, Tamga, Spriggina, Marywadea and Cyanorus). Some cephalozoans from the family Yorgiidae demonstrate pronounced asymmetry of left and right parts of the body. For instance, Yorgia’s initial right isomer is the only one which spreads far towards the left side of the body. Archaeaspinus has an unpaired anterior lobe confined by the furrow to the left side only.

In Cephalonega stepanovi and Tamga hamulifera the zone containing the isomers is encircled by a peripheral, undivided zone. The Cephalonegas isomers are connected to each other, forming a body resembling a rubber raft; the Tamgas isomers are separated from each other, and do not touch.

In Lossinia, the center undivided region has no visible isomers, instead having the lobe-like isomers emanate from the periphery of the undivided region as "transverse articulations."

Dipleurozoa

The dipleurozoan body is subradial, divided by isomers entirely (e.g., Dickinsonia and Phyllozoon). Dickinsonia juveniles show undivided anterior areas but these regions were reduced in the course of ontogeny, and in the adult stages Dickinsonia-like proarticulates changed so radically that they became almost indistinguishable from isomers.

List of Proarticulata

Body fossils 
Armillifera Fedonkin, 1980
A. parva Fedonkin, 1980
Andiva Fedonkin, 2002
A. ivantsovi Fedonkin, 2002
Archaeaspinus Ivantsov, 2007 (=Archaeaspis Ivantsov, 2001)
A. fedonkini Ivantsov, 2001
Cephalonega Ivantsov et al., 2019
C. stepanovi (Fedonkin, 1976)
Chondroplon Wade, 1971 (possible =Dickinsonia)
C. bilobatum Wade, 1971
Cyanorus Ivantsov, 2004
C. singularis Ivantsov, 2004
Dickinsonia Sprigg, 1947
D. costata Sprigg, 1947
D. menneri Keller 1976 (=Vendomia menneri Keller 1976)
D. tenuis Glaessner & Wade, 1966
Ivovicia Ivantsov, 2007
I. rugulosa Ivantsov, 2007
Karakhtia Ivantsov, 2004
K. nessovi Ivantsov, 2004
Lossinia Ivantsov, 2007
L. lissetskii Ivantsov, 2007
Marywadea Glaessner, 1976
M. ovata Glaessner & Wade, 1966
Ovatoscutum Glaessner & Wade, 1966
O. concentricum Glaessner & Wade, 1966
Paravendia Ivantsov, 2004
P. janae Ivantsov, 2001 (=Vendia janae Ivantsov, 2001)
Podolimirus Fedonkin, 1983 (=Valdainia Fedonkin, 1983)
P. mirus Fedonkin, 1983 (Valdainia plumosa Fedonkin, 1983)
Praecambridium Glaessner & Wade, 1966
P. siggilum Glaessner & Wade, 1966
Spriggina Glaessner, 1958
S. floundersi Glaessner, 1958
Tamga Ivantsov, 2007
T. hamulifera Ivantsov, 2007
Vendia Keller, 1969
V. sokolovi Keller, 1969
V. rachiata Ivantsov, 2004
? Windermeria Narbonne, 1994
W. aitkeni Narbonne, 1994
Yorgia Ivantsov, 1999
Y. waggoneri Ivantsov, 1999

Trace fossils 
Epibaion Ivantsov, 2002
E. axiferus Ivantsov, 2002. 
E. waggoneris Ivantsov, 2011. This  is  a  trace  of  Yorgia  waggoneri
E. costatus Ivantsov, 2011.  This is a trace of Dickinsonia costata
Phyllozoon Jenkins & Gehling, 1978
P. hanseni Jenkins & Gehling, 1978

See also 
 Articulata
 List of Ediacaran genera

References

External links 
Database of Ediacaran Biota Advent of Complex Life

 
Animal phyla
Vendobionta